Guzelyalı is an affluent residential neighborhood of Atakum district of Samsun province. The neighborhood had a population of 4,538 as of 2019, up from 1,762 in 2007.

History
Guzelyalı was established primarily as a farming and summer resort community to the west of Samsun. It is a low-lying district along the coast of the Black Sea. Since the 1990s, the neighborhood has developed in a more urban mid-rise form similar to the rest of Atakum. Guzelyalı is bounded by the Black Sea to the north, the Çobanlı Pier to the east, Körfez, Atakum to the west and the Ataturk Boulevard to the south.

Guzelyalı is home to several dozen hotels, guest houses, bars and restaurants which run along Adnan Menderes Boulevard. Due to its pleasant climate and location adjacent to the seafront promenade, the neighborhood has grown rapidly, especially since 2007 as evidenced by census figures from TUIK.

Population

References

Atakum
Samsun